Daniela Buruiană Aprodu (born 19 July 1953 in Brăila) is a Romanian politician and Member of the European Parliament. She is a member of the Greater Romania Party, part of the Identity/Sovereignty/Transparency group, and became an MEP on 1 January 2007 with the accession of Romania to the European Union.

External links
European Parliament profile
European Parliament official photo

1953 births
Living people
Greater Romania Party politicians
Politicians from Brăila
Greater Romania Party MEPs
MEPs for Romania 2007
Women MEPs for Romania
20th-century Romanian politicians
20th-century Romanian women politicians
21st-century Romanian politicians